Gamgee is the surname of:

People
Sampson Gamgee (1828–1886), English physician
Arthur Gamgee (1841–1909), English physiologist; son of Sampson
John Gamgee (1831–1894), English veterinarian and inventor; developer of the Glaciarium (the first mechanically frozen ice rink) and the perpetual motion Zero-moter; older son of Sampson and brother of Arthur

Fictional characters
Samwise Gamgee, member of the family and one of the main characters in The Lord of the Rings

See also
Gamgee Tissue, a type of surgical tissue developed by Sampson Gamgee